Ysgol Dyffryn Nantlle is a bilingual secondary school for pupils aged between 11 and 18 years. It is situated in Penygroes, Gwynedd in Gwynedd, North Wales. The school serves the village of Penygroes and the surrounding rural area. As of 2022, there were 401 pupils enrolled at the school.



General information
84% of pupils come from homes in which Welsh is the main language of the household. Nearly all pupils are able to speak Welsh to first language level and are following a Welsh course.

On the school's badge, the words 'Delfryd Dysg Cymeriad' are inscribed, which translates to "The ideal of education is to build character" or more concisely "Education Builds Character". The school badge was devised by a former art teacher at the school, John Davies.

There are four registration classes in school, Y, D, N and P. There are also four school houses, Silyn, Dulyn, Llifon and Llyfnwy, which draw their names from local rivers and lakes. Pupils are allocated in one each of those when enrolled in year 7. School houses compete annually in the sports day and in the historic school eisteddfod, held in late October.

The school encountered controversy when it refused to provide school meals to children who were 1p in debt. The school changed its policy after comparisons to the workhouse in the Charles Dickens novel Oliver Twist.

Notable former pupils

Bryn Fôn
Sir Bryn Terfel Jones 
Dafydd Glyn Jones 
R. Williams Parry
Elan Closs Stephens 
Angharad Tomos 
Betty Williams
Olwen Williams
Owain Fon Williams

References

Secondary schools in Gwynedd
Dyffryn Nantlle
Llanllyfni